Gonzalo José Campero (born 17 May 1960) is an Argentine sailor. He competed in the Finn event at the 1988 Summer Olympics.

References

1960 births
Living people
Sportspeople from Buenos Aires
Argentine male sailors (sport)
Olympic sailors of Argentina
Sailors at the 1988 Summer Olympics – Finn